Lee Douglas Valmassy (born September 15, 1987)  is an American director and actor. He is best known for starring as L Dubba E The FP (2011) and as Charlie / The Wall in Vs (2011). In all of his American film projects, he has worked in collaboration with Jason Trost.

Filmography

References

External links 

1987 births
Living people
Male actors from San Diego
21st-century American male actors